Estie Wittstock (born 15 September 1980) is a South African sprinter who specialises in the 400 metres.

Competition record

Personal bests
100 m – 11.55 (+0.8) (Potchefstroom 2008)
200 m – 23.31 (+1.0) (Potchefstroom 2004)
400 m – 51.48 (Belém 2004)

External links
 

1980 births
Living people
South African female sprinters
Athletes (track and field) at the 2004 Summer Olympics
Olympic athletes of South Africa
Athletes (track and field) at the 2006 Commonwealth Games
African Games silver medalists for South Africa
African Games medalists in athletics (track and field)
Universiade medalists in athletics (track and field)
African Games bronze medalists for South Africa
Athletes (track and field) at the 2003 All-Africa Games
Athletes (track and field) at the 2007 All-Africa Games
Universiade bronze medalists for South Africa
Medalists at the 2003 Summer Universiade
Commonwealth Games competitors for South Africa
Olympic female sprinters
20th-century South African women
21st-century South African women